The 2008 Porsche Centre Gold Coast 500 was the seventh 500km race held at Queensland Raceway. It was held on 15 November 2008, and only attracted nine entrants.

Results

Qualifying 1
Qualifying session 1 was held on Saturday, 15 November, at 10:30am.

Qualifying 2
Qualifying session 2 was held on Saturday, 15 November, at 11:40am.

Race
The race was held on Saturday, 15 November, at 3:45pm.

* Cars 11 and 29 finished first and second respectively, however were relegated to positions two and three after the race.

References

Porsche Centre Gold Coast 500
Queensland 500